Sequoyah Fuels Corporation owned and operated a uranium processing plant near Gore, Oklahoma. The company was created in 1983 as a subsidiary of Kerr-McGee. In 1988 it was sold to General Atomics.

Uranium processing plant 

The plant is located near Gore, Oklahoma, close to the Illinois River and Interstate 40. The plant started construction in 1968 and began operation in 1970. It converted yellowcake uranium into uranium hexafluoride. In 1987 it started converting depleted uranium hexafluoride into depleted uranium tetrafluoride. The plant ceased operation in 1993. After a leak and explosion in 1986 left one worker dead and extreme groundwater and soil contamination across the 600-acre site. 

The plant was operated under Kerr-McGee Nuclear Corporation. In 1983 KMNC split into Quivira Mining Corporation and Sequoyah Fuels Corporation. The latter was given control of the plant. In 1988 Sequoyah Fuels Corporation was sold to General Atomics.

In 2008 a company named International Isotopes said it would buy equipment and intellectual property from the Sequoyah Fuels Corp plant. The equipment would be used in a new location. It would be used for converting depleted uranium hexafluoride to depleted uranium tetrafluoride.

The 1986 Sequoyah Corporation Fuels Release in Oklahoma 

On January 4, 1986, Sequoyah Fuels Corporation experienced a rupture which killed 26-year-old worker, James Harrison and hospitalized 37 of the 42 onsite workers. The American Journal of Public Health describes the plant as having "never fully recovered" from the accident.

Another accident involving the release of UF6 occurred in 1992. The plant ceased production operations in 1993 and was decommissioned.

See also 
Church Rock uranium mill spill
Uranium mining in the United States
Kerr-McGee
General Atomics
Uranium hexafluoride

References

External links 
New York Times

Nuclear fuel companies
Uranium mining in the United States
Nuclear technology in the United States
Energy companies of the United States
Radioactively contaminated areas
Mining in Oklahoma
Radiation accidents and incidents